Mayerlin Rivas (born 5 December 1987) is a Venezuelan professional boxer. She is a two-weight world champion, having held the WBA female super bantamweight title since February 2020 and previously the WBA female bantamweight title from 2015 to 2018. As of September 2020, she is ranked as the world's third best active female super bantamweight by The Ring and BoxRec.

Early life
Mayerlin Rivas was born on 5 December 1987 in Maracaibo. She participated in wushu and was runner-up in this sport at the National Youth Games. In 2007 she made her boxing debut, against Anys Cedillo, and won by TKO.

Professional career
Rivas drew with Zulina Muñoz in a contest for the WBC Youth female bantamweight title in July 2010. In March 2012 she lost by majority decision (MD) to Daniela Romina Bermúdez for the WBA interim female bantamweight title, and in November 2012 lost to Yazmin Rivas by unanimous decision (UD) in an IBF female bantamweight title fight.

A ninth-round technical knockout (TKO) of Arely Valente in August 2014 made Rivas the WBA interim female bantamweight titleholder. This was just Rivas' second fight since 2012, her first stoppage win in more than three years, and her first victory in a match scheduled over 10 rounds.

In January 2015 she knocked out Calixta Silgado in the fifth-round to win the WBA (Regular) title, becoming the second Venezuelan woman to win a WBA world title, the first being Ogleidis "La Niña" Suárez.

Rivas retained the WBA female bantamweight title against Sayda Mosquera in June 2015, and again against Galina Koleva Ivanova in October 2015. She made another successful defence with a narrow victory on points against Melania Sorroche in 2016. In 2017, she retained the title in a draw against Dayana Cordero.

Rivas won the WBA super bantamweight title in February 2020, with a unanimous decision victory over Laura Ledezma. The scores were 96–94, 98–92 and 96–93 in favour of Rivas, and the win took her record to 16–4–2 with ten knockouts.

Her nickname is "La Monita". She participated in three mixed martial arts bouts from 2012 to 2014, winning two.

Mixed martial arts record

|-
|Loss
|align=center| 2–1
|Silvana Gómez Juárez
|Submission (armbar)
|XFC International 5
|
|align=center|3
|align=center|2:55
|São Paulo, Brazil
| 
|-
|Win
|align=center| 2–0
|Daiana Torquato
|Decision (unanimous)
|XFC International 1
|
|align=center|3
|align=center|5:00
|Osasco, Brazil
|
|-
|Win
|align=center| 1–0
|Stephanie Velandia Galindo
|TKO (punches)
|Striker Fighting Championship 3
|
|align=center| 1
|align=center| 3:00
|Barranquilla, Colombia
|

References

External links
 
  

1987 births
Living people
Venezuelan women boxers
Bantamweight boxers
Sportspeople from Maracaibo
World Boxing Association champions